Signal-transducing adaptor protein 2 is a protein that in humans is encoded by the STAP2 gene.

This gene encodes the substrate of breast tumor kinase, an Src-type non-receptor tyrosine kinase. The encoded protein possesses domains and several tyrosine phosphorylation sites characteristic of adaptor proteins that mediate the interactions linking proteins involved in signal transduction pathways. Alternative splicing results in multiple transcript variants.

Interactions
STAP2 has been shown to interact with PTK6.

References

Further reading